President of Congress  may refer to:

 President of the Congress of Colombia
 President of the All India Congress Committee
 President of the Congress of Peru
 President of the Congress of Deputies, Spain
 President of the Continental Congress, United States

See also
 Speaker (politics)
 List of legislatures by country